Layton is a surname derived from various place names in England. Two known etymologies stem from place names in Lancashire (in Blackpool) and another in North Yorkshire. The former was named in Old English as ‘settlement by the watercourse’, from Old English lād ‘watercourse’ + tūn ‘enclosure’, ‘settlement’; the latter as ‘leek enclosure’ or ‘herb garden’, from lēac ‘leek’ + tūn. Also often spelled as Leighton.

People with the family name
 Bentley Layton (born 1941), American religious scholar
 Bob Layton (born 1953), American comic book artist
 Caleb R. Layton (1851–1930), U.S. Representative from Delaware
 Caleb S. Layton (1798–1882), American politician and judge from Delaware
 Chris Layton (born 1955), American drummer
 Christopher Layton (1821–1898), Latter-day Saint church leader
 Daniel J. Layton (1879–1960), Supreme Court Justice of Delaware
 David Layton (1914–2009), British economist and industrial relations specialist
 Eddie Layton (1925–2004), American organist
 Edwin T. Layton (1903–1984), American naval intelligence officer
 Geoffrey Layton (1884–1964), British admiral
 George Layton (born 1943), British actor
 Gilbert Layton (1899–1961), Canadian politician
 Irving Layton (1912–2006), Canadian poet
 Jack Layton (1950–2011), Canadian politician
 Joe Layton (1931–1994), American director and choreographer
 Lindy Layton (born 1970), British singer
 Michael John Layton, 2nd Baron Layton (1912–1989), British businessman and politician
 Mike Layton (born 1980), Canadian politician
 Paul Layton (born 1947), English bass guitarist
 Randy Layton, American music producer
 Richard Layton (c. 1500-1544), English cleric active in closure of the monasteries
 Richard Layton (1815-1893), English organist of Stamford, Lincolnshire
 Robert Layton (1925–2002), Canadian politician
 Robyn Layton, Australian lawyer
 Roger Layton, developer of MBRwizard
 Stephen Layton (born 1966), English conductor
 Turner Layton (1894–1978), American songwriter, singer and pianist
 Walter Thomas Layton, 1st Baron Layton (1884–1966), British economist, editor, and newspaper proprietor

Fictional character
 Hershel Layton, fictional detective and professor from the Professor Layton series

See also
 Leyton (surname)
 Layton (given name)
 Layton (disambiguation)

English-language surnames
English toponymic surnames